Martin Meinberg (born 14 January 1954) is a German bobsledder. He competed in the four man event at the 1980 Winter Olympics.

References

1954 births
Living people
German male bobsledders
Olympic bobsledders of West Germany
Bobsledders at the 1980 Winter Olympics
Sportspeople from Gelsenkirchen